Richard John Micklethwait  (born 11 August 1962) is editor-in-chief of Bloomberg News, a position he has held since February 2015. A British journalist, he was previously the editor-in-chief of The Economist from 2006 to 2015.

Life and career 
Micklethwait was born in 1962, in London, and was educated at Ampleforth College (an independent school) and Magdalen College, Oxford, where he studied history. He worked for Chase Manhattan Bank for two years and joined The Economist in 1987. Prior to becoming editor-in-chief, he was United States editor of the publication and ran the New York Bureau for two years. Before that, he edited the Business Section of the newspaper for four years. His other roles have included setting up an office in Los Angeles for The Economist, where he worked from 1990 to 1993. He has covered business and politics from the United States, Latin America, Continental Europe, Southern Africa and most of Asia.

Appointed as editor-in-chief on 23 March 2006, the first issue of The Economist published under his editorship was released on 7 April 2006. He was named Editors' Editor by the British Society of Magazine Editors in 2010. Micklethwait has frequently appeared on CNN, ABC News, BBC, C-SPAN, PBS and NPR.

In 2015 he was appointed as a Trustee of the British Museum.  He was also a delegate, along with two colleagues, at the 2010 Bilderberg Conference held in Spain. This group consists of an assembly of notable politicians, industrialists and financiers who meet annually to discuss issues on a non-disclosure basis.

Micklethwait was appointed Commander of the Order of the British Empire (CBE) in the 2016 Birthday Honours for services to journalism and economics.

In November 2019, Micklethwait ordered his staff not to investigate their boss, Michael Bloomberg, nor any other Democratic candidates, during Bloomberg's presidential campaign.

Bibliography 
Micklethwait is the co-author of several books with Adrian Wooldridge, including:

The Witch Doctors (1996)
A Future Perfect: the Challenge and Hidden Promise of Globalisation (2000)
The Company — A Short History of a Revolutionary Idea (2003)
The Right Nation: A Study of Conservatism in America (2004)
God is Back (2009)
The Fourth Revolution: The Global Race To Reinvent The State (2014)
The Wake-Up Call: Why the Pandemic has Exposed the Weakness of the West, and How to Fix It (2020)

In A Future Perfect, Wooldridge and Micklethwait resurrected the term "cosmocrat".

References

External links 
 Profile at The Economist
 Inside The Economist Magazine- Stanford's Hoover Institution interview with Micklethwait
 John Micklethwait: Great Minds like a think- Profile of Micklethwait from The Independent – Archived copy
 Conversations With History Interview with Micklethwait at the Institute of International Studies, UC Berkeley
 Biography from the London Speaker Bureau
 Interview on OpenDemocracy.net
 Biography from Random House
 Interview on The Alligator Online
 
 C-SPAN Q&A interview with Micklethwait, 2 December 2007
 
 

1962 births
Living people
British editors
British male journalists
British writers
People educated at Ampleforth College
The Economist editors
Alumni of Magdalen College, Oxford
Writers from London
English male writers
Trustees of the British Museum
Commanders of the Order of the British Empire
Carnegie Council for Ethics in International Affairs